Live from Soundscape is a live album by jazz composer, bandleader and keyboardist Sun Ra and his Arkestra recorded in New York City in 1979 and released on the Japanese DIW label in 1994. Initial pressings of the album contained a bonus CD featuring a lecture by Sun Ra.

Reception
The Allmusic review by Sean Westergaard awarded the album 3 stars stating "Sound quality, while good, is not perfect, gearing the release more towards the serious fan".

Track listing
All compositions by Sun Ra except where noted

Disc One:
 " Astro Black" – 11:52
 "Where There Is No Sun" – 4:05
 "Living in the Space Age" – 2:03
 "Keep Your Sunny Side Up" (Lew Brown, Buddy DeSylva, Ray Henderson ) – 2:52
 "D.27" – 12:36
 "Watusi" – 12:23
 "Space Is the Place" – 7:56
 "We Travel the Space Ways	" – 7:33
 "On Jupiter, the Skies are Always Blue" – 6:40
Disc Two:
 The Possibility of Altered Destiny – 72:40

Personnel
Sun Ra – piano, keyboards
Michael Ray – trumpet, vocals
Walter Miller – trumpet
Vincent Chancey – French horn
Charles Stephens – trombone
Marshall Allen – alto saxophone
Skeeter McFarland – electric guitar
Damon Choice – vibraphone
Richard Williams – bass
Luqman Ali – drums
Atakatune – percussion
June Tyson – vocals, dance

References 

Sun Ra live albums
DIW Records live albums
1994 live albums